Elaphrus japonicus is a species of ground beetle in the subfamily Elaphrinae. It was described by Ueno in 1954.

References

Elaphrinae
Beetles described in 1954